Patricio Sebastián Castañeda Muñoz (born 2 February 1986) is a Chilean football.

He played for Deportes Antofagasta, winning second-tier's 2011 Torneo Apertura.

Teams

Player
Deportes Antofagasta
Primera B (1): 2011 Apertura

References

External links
 
 

1986 births
Living people
Chilean footballers
Cobreloa footballers
C.D. Antofagasta footballers
Chilean Primera División players
Primera B de Chile players
Association football defenders